"Anthem Part Two" is a song by American rock band Blink-182 from the band's fourth studio album, Take Off Your Pants and Jacket (2001) and a sequel to "Anthem" from Enema of the State. It was written primarily by guitarist Tom DeLonge, with additional songwriting credit to bassist Mark Hoppus, and drummer Travis Barker.

"Anthem Part Two" explores teenage rebellion, placing blame on parents for adolescent mischief. Music critics were mixed in their impressions of the song; some found it enjoyable while others considered it formulaic. The song has been used in the 2014 film Boyhood and was covered by singer-songwriter Julien Baker in 2020.

Background

Blink-182 attracted mainstream recognition with its 1999 album Enema of the State, which sold five times platinum domestically and influenced a host of pop punk bands. Its follow-up, 2001's Take Off Your Pants and Jacket, followed a similar path, hitting number one on the Billboard 200. For the project, the trio aimed to make a groovier, less polished effort than its predecessor; central points of inspiration included post-hardcore acts like Fugazi and Refused. "Anthem Part Two" track takes its title from the final song on Enema, "Anthem"; it serves as a sequel and logical continuation of similar themes.

Though credited to all three band members, "Anthem Part Two" was largely composed by DeLonge. Hoppus has considered the song among DeLonge's best: "The intro still gives [me] chills," he wrote on Twitter in 2020, singling out its "stab of guitars and drums with the arpeggiated guitar line" as a highlight. To write the song, DeLonge explored his memories of high school:

Lyrically, the song explores parental responsibility and adolescent frustration. Its chorus places blame for teenage misconduct squarely on parents, declaring, "If we're fucked up, you're to blame." The song's rebellious verses claim "We need guidance, we've been misled / Young and hostile but not stupid." During the song's bridge, DeLonge repeats with increasing intensity that "everything has fallen to pieces." Variety writer Troy J. Augusto interpreted the lyrics as a "cry out for leadership in a seemingly out-of-control world." According to sheet music published at Musicnotes.com by Kobalt Music Publishing America, "Anthem Part Two" is written in common time with a tempo of 207 beats per minute, and is set in the key of C major. DeLonge's vocal parts span from c5 to G5.

Reception

Critical reception towards "Anthem Part Two" was mixed. Greg Kot of the Chicago Tribune identified "Anthem Part Two" as an example of the group's subtle "undercurrent of seriousness and an attention to songcraft." Kyle Ryan, writing for The A.V. Club called it "one of Jacket best songs, with a massively catchy four-chord chorus and just the right amount of self-righteous rebellion for teenagers to sing along."

Darren Ratner, writing for Allmusic, considered it "irresistible," opining that it houses a "indomitable school-kid voice where a surging vapor of knockout speed chords meet wrecking-ball percussion." Among the more negative reviews, Aaron Scott of Slant Magazine found the song "rocking and almost musically interesting", but its content "dubious coming from three guys who are nearly 30." Steven Wells at NME was derisive, bemoaning its "whiny vocals" and "brittle-boned punk-superlite guitar." Joshua Klein of The Washington Post considered it too formulaic, describing its "cookie-cutter" arrangement as too similar to the band's past singles.

In a 2020 piece for Nylon, Jack Barakat of All Time Low and Ryan Key of Yellowcard—both among the band's descendants—praised the song among their favorites of the genre. Key remarked: "The snare drum sounded like a shotgun. The sparkly clean guitar riff was such a different sound for a punk song. That whole record blew my mind at the time, but I’ve always put a lot of stock in album openers, and that song may be the best of any pop-punk record ever made."

Usage in media and other versions
Director Richard Linklater selected "Anthem Part Two" to soundtrack a singular growing-up montage in his 2014 film Boyhood. Singer-songwriter Julien Baker in 2020 covered the song for Save Stereogum: An '00s Covers Comp, a digital compilation benefitting the music website. Justin Curto of the blog Vulture described it as a "tearjerker performance."

Personnel
Adapted from the liner notes for Take Off Your Pants and Jacket.

Locations
 Recorded at Signature Sound (San Diego, California) and Larrabee Studios West and Cello Studios (Hollywood, California)

Blink-182
 Mark Hoppus – bass guitar, vocals
 Tom DeLonge – guitars, vocals
 Travis Barker – drums, percussion

Additional musicians
 Roger Joseph Manning, Jr. – keyboards

Production
 Jerry Finn – production
 Tom Lord-Alge – mixing
 Joe McGrath – engineering
 Joe Marlett – assistant engineer
 Ted Reiger – assistant engineer
 Robert Read – assistant engineer
 Femio Hernandez – mixing assistant
 Mike "Sack" Fasano – drum tech
 Brian Gardner – mastering

References 

2001 songs
Blink-182 songs
Songs written by Mark Hoppus
Songs written by Travis Barker
Songs written by Tom DeLonge